James Anderson defeated Gerald Patterson 6–0, 3–6, 3–6, 6–3, 6–2 in the final to win the men's singles tennis title at the 1922 Australasian Championships.

Draw

Key
 Q = Qualifier
 WC = Wild card
 LL = Lucky loser
 r = Retired

Earlier rounds

Section 1

Section 2

Section 3

Section 4

External links
  Grand Slam Tennis Archive – Australian Open 1922
 

1922 in Australian tennis
Men's Singles